Sigurdur Franklin Fredrickson (Sigurður Franklín Friðriksson; June 3, 1895 – May 28, 1979) was an Icelandic-Canadian ice hockey player and aviator. As a player and coach, he was significant to both the amateur and professional ice hockey as it evolved in North America in the early 20th century.  Fredrickson's career was interrupted by military service during the First World War and prematurely ended by a knee injury in 1931.

Fredrickson was the center for the Winnipeg Falcons, the Canadian team which won the Olympic gold medal in 1920. Fredrickson then joined the Victoria Aristocrats/Victoria Cougars and helped them win the Stanley Cup in 1925. On both occasions he was a teammate of fellow Icelandic-Canadian ice hockey star Haldor Halderson, making them the first players to win an Olympic gold medal and a Stanley Cup.

Fredrickson became one of the pioneers of flight in Iceland when he arrived there in 1920 to fly for the countries first airline, Flugfélag Íslands.

The Icelandic spelling of his last name is Friðriksson and the alternate English spelling Frederickson.

Early life
Fredrickson was born in Winnipeg, Manitoba as Sigurður Franklín Friðriksson, to Icelandic immigrants Jón Vídalín Friðriksson and Guðlaug S. Sigurðardóttir. He spoke Icelandic at home, and learned English when he started school.

Ice hockey career

Amateur career
Fredrickson attended Kelvin Technical Institute and Central Collegiate before enrolling at the University of Manitoba law school, where he captained the hockey team. He enlisted in the 196th Battalion in February 1916 to join the First World War, but soon transferred to the 223rd Battalion, and by May 1917 was in Europe. Prior to leaving for Europe he played for the battalion's hockey team in the Winnipeg Amateur Patriotic league, scoring 17 goals in 6 games. He transferred once again to the Royal Flying Corps, and was sent to Egypt for training. While on his way back from Egypt the ship he was on, the SS Leasowe Castle, was hit by a German torpedo and sank. Fredrickson was then posted to Scotland to serve as a trainer and test pilot, where he ended the war.

Back in Winnipeg, Frederickson captained the Winnipeg Falcons, to the 1920 Allan Cup and then to the first gold medal offered in ice hockey at the 1920 Olympics at Antwerp. Following the Olympics he moved to Iceland to work for Flugfélag Íslands, the first airliner in the country, in introducing airplanes to the local population. On 25 June 1920, he became the second man to pilot a plane in Iceland, after Cecil Faber. While in Iceland, he competed in track and field and set a new national record in discus. In October, he moved back to Canada.

Professional career
Professionally, Fredrickson played for the Victoria Cougars of the Pacific Coast Hockey Association and the Boston Bruins, Pittsburgh Pirates, and Detroit Falcons in the National Hockey League. He helped Victoria win the Stanley Cup in 1925.

Fredrickson signed a professional contract with the Victoria Aristocrats of the Pacific Coast Hockey Association (PCHA) in 1920, being offered C$2,500 for the season. However he initially hesitated, and missed the first 3 games of the regular season before joining the team; he made his debut on January 1, 1921. Fredrickson finished the season tied with Smokey Harris for the most points in the PCHA, with 32, but as Fredrickson had more goals (20 to 15), he was credited as the league's scoring champion. He finished the following season with 15 goals and 10 assists.

During the 1926–27 season Frederickson's salary was reportedly $6,000, the highest in the NHL.

On January 18, 1927, Fredrickson scored four goals in a single game for Boston in the Bruins' 7–3 victory over the New York Rangers. He became the second Bruin to achieve this feat. Teammate Harry Oliver had done it exactly one week before.

On December 21, 1928, Fredrickson was traded from the Boston Bruins to the Pittsburgh Pirates for Mickey MacKay. When the Stanley Cup was redone during the 1957–58 NHL season his name was engraved, contrary to NHL rules, on the Cup with the 1929 Bruins. Fredrickson was a member of the Pittsburgh Pirates the day Boston won the Cup. This made him ineligible to be on the cup with Boston.

Fredrickson coached hockey and lacrosse after his retirement. He coached the Pittsburgh Pirates during the 1929–1930 season, when he also played 9 games, but the team went 5-36-3 and moved to Philadelphia the next season before folding. In 1933, Fredrickson was named coach of the Princeton University ice hockey team. While at Princeton he befriended Albert Einstein, who was working as a professor there; the two shared an interest in the violin. Fredrickson was inducted into the Hockey Hall of Fame in 1958 and is also a member of the Manitoba Sports Hall of Fame and Museum.

Playing style

Fredrickson was a natural centre forward, a left-hand shot, and with all the valuable traits of a franchise pivot man: skating, speed, stick-handling, size and a terrific shot.

When Fredrickson made his long-awaited professional debut in the PCHA with the Victoria Aristocrats against the Vancouver Millionaires on New Year's Day 1921 he was already 25 years old and an Allan Cup and Olympic champion, and the anticipations among the home fans in Victoria were sky high, although there were also some doubters who wondered if he could star in the PCHA circuit. Fredrickson did not let anyone down, when he was finally let on by coach Lester Patrick after 10 minutes of play, after he had shaken off his last nerves. During the last period of the game Fredrickson had one goal and two assists when Victoria turned the game around and won 5 goals to 3, with the local newspaper Victoria Daily Times hailing him as the new "Babe Ruth of hockey" and claiming that "he showed everything and lacked nothing."

Career statistics

Regular season and playoffs

All statistics taken from NHL.com

Coaching record

Awards and achievements

Allan Cup championship (1920)
Olympic gold medalist (1920)
PCHA First All-Star Team (1921, 1922, 1923, and 1924)
PCHA Scoring Champion (1923)
PCHA Goals Leader (1923)
Stanley Cup championships (1925 and 1929)
WCHL First All-Star Team (1926)
Inducted into the Hockey Hall of Fame in 1958
Selected to Manitoba's All-Century Second All-Star Team
Inducted into the Manitoba Sports Hall of Fame and Museum in 1981
Honoured Member of the Manitoba Hockey Hall of Fame

Personal life
Fredrickson was married to Beatrice Stefánsdóttir who was also of Icelandic-Canadian descent.

References

Bibliography

Sigurdur Franklin "Frank" Fredrickson at Manitoba Historical Society

External links

1895 births
1979 deaths
Boston Bruins players
Canadian ice hockey centres
Canadian ice hockey coaches
Canadian military personnel of World War I
Canadian people of Icelandic descent
Detroit Cougars players
Detroit Falcons players
Hockey Hall of Fame inductees
Ice hockey player-coaches
Ice hockey players at the 1920 Summer Olympics
Medalists at the 1920 Summer Olympics
Olympic gold medalists for Canada
Olympic ice hockey players of Canada
Olympic medalists in ice hockey
Pittsburgh Pirates (NHL) coaches
Pittsburgh Pirates (NHL) players
Ice hockey people from Winnipeg
Stanley Cup champions
Victoria Aristocrats players
Victoria Cougars (1911–1926) players
Winnipeg Falcons players